Gliese 710, or HIP 89825, is an orange  star in the constellation Serpens Cauda. It is projected to pass near the Sun in about 1.29 million years at a predicted minimum distance of 0.051 parsecs— (about 1.60 trillion km) – about 1/25th of the current distance to Proxima Centauri. Such a distance would make for a similar brightness to the brightest planets, optimally reaching an apparent visual magnitude of about −2.7. The star's proper motion will peak around one arcminute per year, a rate of apparent motion that would be noticeable over a human lifespan. This is a timeframe, based on data from Gaia DR3,  well within the parameters of current models which cover the next 15 million years.

Description
A stellar classification of K7 Vk means it is a small main-sequence star mostly generating energy through the thermonuclear fusion of hydrogen at its core. (The suffix 'k' indicates that the spectrum shows absorption lines from interstellar matter.) Stellar mass is about 57% of the Sun's mass with an estimated 58% of the Sun's radius. It is suspected to be a variable star that may vary in magnitude from 9.65 to 9.69. As of 2020, no planets have been detected orbiting it.

Computing and details of the closest approach 

In their work Bobylev et.al in 2010 suggested Gliese 710 has an 86% chance of passing through the Oort cloud, assuming the Oort cloud to be a spheroid around the Sun with semiminor and semimajor axes of 80,000 and 100,000 AU respectively. The distance of closest approach of Gliese 710 is generally difficult to compute precisely as it depends sensitively on its current position and velocity; Bobylev et.al. estimated that Gliese_710 would pass within  of the Sun. At the time, there was even a 1 in 10,000 chance of the star penetrating into the region (d < 1,000 AU) where the influence of the passing star on Kuiper belt objects would be significant.

The effects of such an encounter on the orbit of the Pluto–Charon system (and therefore, on the classical trans-Neptunian belt) are negligible, but Gliese 710 will traverse the outer Oort cloud (inside 100,000 AU or 0.48 pc) and reach the outskirts of the inner Oort cloud (inward of 20,000 AU).

Gliese 710 has the potential to perturb the Oort cloud in the outer Solar System, exerting enough force to send showers of comets into the inner Solar System for millions of years, triggering visibility of about ten naked-eye comets per year, and possibly causing an impact event. According to Filip Berski and Piotr Dybczyński, this event will be "the strongest disrupting encounter in the future and history of the Solar System". Earlier dynamic models indicated that the net increase in cratering rate due to the passage of Gliese 710 would be no more than 5%. They had originally estimated that the closest approach would happen in 1,360,000 years when the star will approach within  of the Sun. Gaia DR2 later found the minimum perihelion distance to be  or  about 1.281 million years from now.

Table of parameters of predictions of Gliese 710 encounter with Sun

See also 
 Gliese 710 in fiction
 List of nearest stars and brown dwarfs

Notes

References

External links
 SolStation.com
 VizieR variable star database
 Wikisky image of HD 168442 (Gliese 710)
 

BD-01 3474
168442
089825
0710
K-type main-sequence stars
Serpens (constellation)
TIC objects